Reginald Sherard Walton (born 1952) is a former professional baseball player. He played for the Seattle Mariners and Pittsburgh Pirates of Major League Baseball (MLB). He played the 1980 and '81 seasons for the Seattle Mariners and his final season for the Pirates in 1982. His batting average was .250 and he played outfield. Walton is originally from Kansas City, Missouri.

External links
, or Baseball Almanac, or Pura Pelota (Venezuelan Winter League)

1952 births
Living people
African-American baseball players
American expatriate baseball players in Mexico
Baseball players from Kansas City, Missouri
Decatur Commodores players
Fresno Giants players
Great Falls Giants players
Hawaii Islanders players
Lafayette Drillers players
Major League Baseball left fielders
Major League Baseball right fielders
Mineros de Coahuila players
Navegantes del Magallanes players
American expatriate baseball players in Venezuela
Pittsburgh Pirates players
Portland Beavers players
Seattle Mariners players
Spokane Indians players
Sultanes de Monterrey players
21st-century African-American people
20th-century African-American sportspeople